The 23rd Annual SunBank 24 at Daytona was a 24-hour endurance sports car race held on February 2–3, 1985 at the Daytona International Speedway road course. The race served as the opening round of the 1985 IMSA GT Championship.

Victory overall and in the GTP class went to the No. 8 Henn's Swap Shop Racing Porsche 962 driven by A. J. Foyt, Bob Wollek, Al Unser, and Thierry Boutsen. Victory in the GTO class went to the No. 65 Roush Racing Ford Mustang driven by Wally Dallenbach Jr., John Jones and Doc Bundy. Victory in the Lights class went to the No. 93 Mid-O/Rusty Jones Argo JM16 driven by Kelly Marsh, Ron Pawley, and Don Marsh. Victory in the GTU class went to the No. 71 Team Highball Mazda RX-7 driven by Amos Johnson, Jack Dunham, and Yojiro Terada.

Race results
Class winners in bold.

References

24 Hours of Daytona
1985 in sports in Florida
1985 in American motorsport